André David Aguilar Guevara (born August 30, 1997) is a Mexican footballer who plays as a midfielder for the reserve team of Spanish club Salamanca CF.

References

External links
 
 
 
 
 
 

1997 births
Living people
Association football midfielders
Mexican expatriate footballers
C.F. Monterrey players
Murciélagos FC footballers
Ascenso MX players
Tercera División players
Footballers from Nuevo León
Sportspeople from Monterrey
Mexican expatriate sportspeople in Spain
Expatriate footballers in Spain
Mexican footballers